Centrin-2 is a protein that in humans is encoded by the CETN2 gene. It belongs to the centrin family of proteins.

Centrin-2 belongs to a family of calcium-binding proteins and is a structural component of the centrosome.  The high level of conservation from algae to humans and its association with the centrosome suggested that centrin-2 plays a fundamental role in the structure and function of the microtubule-organizing center, possibly required for the proper duplication and segregation of the centrosome.

Interactions
CETN2 has been shown to interact with XPC and SFI1.

References

External links

Further reading

EF-hand-containing proteins